Harry Christopher Novillo (born 11 February 1992) is a Martiniquais professional footballer who recently played as a striker and winger .

Club career

Olympique Lyonnais
Born in Lyon, France, Novillo joined Lyon when he was seven years old in 1999, having previously played for another youth academy, Saint-Fons. Novillo was promoted to professional team in July 2010.

He made his professional debut at Lyon on 7 August 2010 in a league match against Monaco, coming on as a substitute for Ederson. Novillo made his second appearance for Lyon on 13 August 2011 in a league match against  Ajaccio, coming on as a substitute for Bafétimbi Gomis. Two years later, Novillo made two Europa League appearances against Sparta Prague and Hapoel Ironi Kiryat Shmona.

Loan to Le Havre AC
On deadline day, Novillo joined Le Havre on loan for the rest of the 2011–12 season. Novillo made his Le Havre debut on 9 September 2011, in a 2–1 win over Tours. Eleven days later on 20 September 2011, Novillo scored his first goal for the club, in a 1–1 draw against Le Mans. Novillo went on to make sixteen appearances for the club, having been absent throughout the season.

Loan to Gazélec Ajaccio
In January 2013, Novillo joined Gazélec Ajaccio on loan until the end of the season. Novillo's debut was delayed over dislocated shoulder in training that will keep him out from fifteen to twenty days. However, Novillo's debut came on 15 February 2013, which he scored, in a 3–2 loss against Nîmes Olympique. His second goal then came on 29 March 2013, in a 2–1 loss against Chamois Niortais. Novillo went on to make seven appearances and scoring twice for Gazélec Ajaccio. Upon returning to his parent club, Novillo was released by the club on 22 August 2013. Novillo later stated he left because of his strained relationship with then Manager Rémi Garde.

Mons
After leaving Lyon, Novillo moved abroad to Belgium by joining Mons on a two-year contract, with an options of extending into two years and was given number 10 shirt. Novillo made his Mons debut on 14 September 2013, coming on as a substitute for Mustapha Jarju, in a 1–1 draw against Waasland-Beveren.

However, Novillo only made two appearances and at the end of the season, Novillo was released by the club. Novillo said about his move on Mons, quoting: " I did not play due to certain people who had problems with those who had slightly darker skin than others" and "I think that the Belgian way of life was not for me. Already the Flemish and the Walloons don't like each other so it won't be the French who they particularly like either! That is what counted against me when I went over there. They did not want to play me for reasons that they themselves seemed to ignore."

Clermont Foot
Novillo returned to France by joining Clermont on a three-year contract.

Novillo made his Clermont Foot debut in the opening game of the season against Brest. On 22 August 2014, Novillo scored his first goal for the club, in a 4–3 loss against his former club, Gazélec Ajaccio. Four days later, Novillo scored in the second round of Coupe De La Ligue, in a 3–1 win over Châteauroux Novillo scored again on 29 September 2014, in a 1–0 win over Tours. Novillo's fourth goal came in the Round of 32 of Coupe De La Ligue, in a 4–3 loss against Caen.

After six months at Clermont Font, Novillo had his contract terminated on 13 January 2015. This came after Novillo was involved in an incident with his teammates.

Shortly leaving Clermont Font, Novillo went on trial at Saint-Étienne, with a view to earning a contract. However, Novillo didn't attend the trial as a request from the club.

Melbourne City
On 2 March 2015, Novillo signed for Australian side Melbourne City on an injury replacement contract for Damien Duff.

Novillo made his debut against the Central Coast Mariners, coming on as a substitute for David Williams, which Melbourne City lost 1–0. His next game was on 14 March 2015 against Newcastle Jets in which he scored his first goal. A week later on 3 April 2015, Novillo scored his second goal for the club, in a 1–1 draw against Western Sydney Wanderers. Novillo scored the winner against Wellington Phoenix to send City through to their first ever A-league semi-final. As his short-term was about to expire, Novillo's contract with Melbourne City was extended for two years, taking a foreign visa slot.

Manisaspor
On 22 June 2016, it was announced that Melbourne City FC had agreed to transfer Novillo to Turkish second division club Manisaspor, for an undisclosed fee. Novillo made only six appearances for Manisaspor in an injury-plagued season with the club and left the club in the January 2017 transfer window.

Baniyas Club
In January 2017, Arabian Gulf League side Baniyas Club announced it had acquired Novillo for the remainder of the 2016/17 season.

Johor Darul Ta'zim FC
In May 2018, Novillo moved to Malaysian Super League club Johor Darul Ta'zim FC, the reigning league champions. He made an immediate impression at the club, scoring in his debut match against Selangor FA.

But in the end of May, Novillo was dropped from JDT squad due poor performances after three matches, announced by TMJ itself. TMJ said, "Even after signing players for millions, if I see that those players aren't performing after a few games, they can leave and I will look for their replacements for JDT. That's never happened in Malaysian football, but this is JDT." He also said, that Novillo had done well by scoring on his debut against Selangor (on 12 May), but failed to replicate that form against Negeri Sembilan FA and PKNS FC.

Montreal Impact
On 5 December 2018, Novillo signed with the Montreal Impact that is managed by his former coach Rémi Garde. On 22 July 2019, Montreal and Novillo agreed to terminate his contract with the club.

International career
Born in Lyon, France, Novillo is a France youth international, having earned caps at under-17 level. He has also represented the Martinique national football team.

Honours

Personal

 PFA A-League Team of the Season: 2015-16

References

External links
 Harry Novillo profile MelbourneCityFC.com.au
 Harry Novillo profile at olweb.fr
 
 

1992 births
Living people
Footballers from Lyon
Association football wingers
French footballers
French people of Martiniquais descent
Martiniquais footballers
Olympique Lyonnais players
Le Havre AC players
Gazélec Ajaccio players
R.A.E.C. Mons players
Clermont Foot players
Melbourne City FC players
Manisaspor footballers
CF Montréal players
Baniyas Club players
Al Urooba Club players
Ligue 1 players
Ligue 2 players
Belgian Pro League players
UAE First Division League players
UAE Pro League players
French expatriate footballers
Expatriate footballers in Belgium
French expatriate sportspeople in Belgium
Expatriate soccer players in Australia
French expatriate sportspeople in Australia
Expatriate footballers in Malaysia
French expatriate sportspeople in Malaysia
Expatriate soccer players in Canada
French expatriate sportspeople in Canada
France youth international footballers
Martinique international footballers
2014 Caribbean Cup players
Major League Soccer players